The Windward School is a coeducational, independent day school focused on teaching students in grades 1-9 with language-based learning disabilities with campuses in Westchester and Manhattan. Windward is recognized across the country and around the world as a leader in providing instruction to children with dyslexia and is listed among the best schools in the New York City area.

The school uses the Preventing Academic Failure (PAF) reading program developed by Phyllis Bertin and Eileen Perlman, which focuses on reading, spelling and handwriting using Orton-Gillingham instruction (multisensory method developed to teach reading to children with dyslexia). Scholarships are available for students whose families cannot afford to pay the $66,900-a-year tuition.

History 
The Windward School was founded in 1926 by Isabel Greenbaum Stone.  The school subsequently certified with the New York State Board of Regents as a school for learning disabled children in 1976. When Dr. Judith Hochman became head of school in 1988, the school shifted its focus to students with language-based learning disabilities and is now regarded as one of the top schools in the U.S. for students with these issues.

In 1988, the Windward Teacher Training Institute was founded to provide the type of professional development for educators and professionals in allied disciplines to have the expertise to teach children of all abilities--in special education and mainstream classrooms--using the Windward Way. In January 2020, WTTI was renamed The Windward Institute.

References

External links 
The Windward School website 
PAF Program website
Orton-Gillingham website
Windward Teacher Training Institute website

Educational institutions established in 1926
1926 establishments in New York (state)